Noctambules is a ballet created in 1956 by Kenneth MacMillan for the Sadler's Wells Ballet. The ballet was choreographed to Humphrey Searle's Noctambules, Op. 30 written for the ballet. The set and costumes were designed by Nicholas Georgiadis. The ballet premiered on 1 March 1956 at the Royal Opera House, Covent Garden, London.

Original cast
 The Hypnotist – Leslie Edwards
 His Assistant – Maryon Lane
 The Faded Beauty – Nadia Nerina
 The Poor Girl – Anya Linden
 The Rich Man – Desmond Doyle
 The Soldier – Brian Shaw

The corps de ballet was divided into "rich people" and "poor people". Notable dancers among the "rich" included Australian choreographer Ronald Hynd and South African dancer Gary Burne. Notable dancers among the "poor" included Merle Park, Doreen Wells and Pirmin Trecu.

References
 Noctambules – 1 March 1956; The Royal Opera House Collections Online, Retrieved 2008-11-03

1956 ballet premieres
Ballets by Kenneth MacMillan
Ballets created for The Royal Ballet
Ballets designed by Nicholas Georgiadis
Ballets by Humphrey Searle